Henry Fell (fl. 1672), was a Quaker missionary and writer.

Fell was a member of one of the numerous Lancashire families bearing his surname. The first mention of him is in 1656 as suffering much from the magistrates in Essex, and in the same year he went as a missionary to the West Indies, where he remained about a year. After his return to England he was engaged as a travelling preacher, and is referred to by his contemporaries as having been eloquent and successful. In 1659 he was seriously ill-treated by some soldiers near Westminster Hall, and in 1660 Richard Hubberthorne, the quaker, represented to Charles II that at Thetford, Norfolk, Fell had been hauled out of a meeting, and, after being whipped, turned out of the town, and passed as a vagabond from parish to parish to Lancashire. In a letter to Margaret Fell (Swarthmore MSS.) Fell states that he was imprisoned for some time at Thetford. He was in London during the rising of the Fifth-monarchy men in this year, and was knocked down by the soldiers as a rioter, and Fox (Journal, p. 314, ed. 1765) says he would have been killed but for the interposition of the Duke of York. In 1661 he was ‘moved,’ in company with John Stubbs, to promulgate his views in ‘foreign parts, especially to Prester John's country and China.’ As no shipmasters would carry them, the quakers got a warrant from the king, which the East India Company found means to avoid. They then went to Holland, and, being unable to obtain shipping there, proceeded to Alexandria. The English consul banished them from the place as nuisances, and they were compelled to return to England. After spending some time in religious journeys, he again visited the West Indies, and a letter in the Shackleton collection states that in 1672 he was living in Barbados, that he was married, in debt, and much depressed. Nothing more is known of his life. Fell was a man of highly devotional spirit, and full of benevolence and courage. His few and brief writings show him to have received an education above the average; their style is good, and the language well chosen.

Bibliography
‘An Alarum of Truth sounded forth to the Nations,’ &c., 1660. 
 ‘To Charles, King of England, Scotland, and Ireland, from one who is in prison, a Sufferer for the Testimony of his Conscience,’ &c., 1660. 
‘A Plain Record or Declaration showing the Original Root and Race of Persecution,’ 1661.

References

Year of birth missing
Year of death missing
English Quakers
Converts to Quakerism
Clergy from Lancashire
Quaker missionaries
17th-century Quakers
17th-century English writers
17th-century English male writers
English male writers
English Protestant missionaries
Protestant missionaries in Barbados
Protestant missionaries in Egypt